Michel van Oostrum (born 22 August 1966) is a retired Dutch football striker who ended his professional career in 2002. He twice became topscorer in the Dutch First Division, playing for FC Emmen: in 1996 (26 goals) and 1997 (25 goals). Van Oostrum had a short spell in Switzerland with BSC Old Boys (1989–1990).

References
  Profile

1966 births
Living people
Footballers from Amsterdam
Dutch footballers
Association football forwards
FC Emmen players
De Graafschap players
SC Cambuur players
SC Telstar players
Eredivisie players
Eerste Divisie players
Dutch expatriate footballers
Expatriate footballers in Switzerland
Dutch expatriate sportspeople in Switzerland
Swiss Super League players